Bootleg Canyon Mountain Bike Park is an internationally renowned venue located in Bootleg Canyon within the northern section of Boulder City, Nevada, in the desert near Lake Mead and Hoover Dam. Consisting of a variety of different types of trails including cross-country (XC) and downhill (DH), the park was created by artist and cycling enthusiast Brent Thomson.   International Mountain Bicycling Association has designated Bootleg Canyon as an "Epic ride".

Photography and maps
Gallery
Map at Official website: BootlegCanyon.net
Southern Nevada Mountain Bike Association: Bootleg Canyon
Bootleg Canyon on Google Earth with .kmz download file: Bootleg Canyon Mountain Bike Park, Boulder City NV

External links
 Bootleg Canyon on Trailforks Map, photos & conditions

References 

Tourist attractions in Nevada
Mountain biking venues in the United States
Boulder City, Nevada
Sports venues in Nevada